Longfellow School (also known as Deniston School) at the corner of Monroe Street and McClure Avenue in Swissvale, Pennsylvania, was built in 1902.  It was added to the National Register of Historic Places on June 28, 1984.

The building was in use as residential apartments until February 2012, when residents were evicted based on a determination by the Swissvale Fire Chief that the building had become uninhabitable.

References

School buildings on the National Register of Historic Places in Pennsylvania
Buildings and structures in Allegheny County, Pennsylvania
School buildings completed in 1902
Neoclassical architecture in Pennsylvania
National Register of Historic Places in Allegheny County, Pennsylvania
1902 establishments in Pennsylvania